Denys Mykolayovych Antyukh (born 30 July 1997) is a Ukrainian professional footballer who plays as a midfielder for Zorya Luhansk.

Career
Born in Okhtyrka, Antyukh is a product of the local Naftovyk-Ukrnafta Okhtyrka and UFK Kharkiv youth sportive schools. He began his career in the amateur level (Naftovyk-Ukrnafta-2 in Sumy Oblast), but in a short time was joined to the main team squad and played in the Ukrainian First League.

In July 2018 he signed his next contract with another Ukrainian First League side Kolos Kovalivka. He made his debut in the Ukrainian Premier League for Kolos (after this team was promoted) on 11 August 2019, playing as the second half-time substituted player in a losing home match against Zorya Luhansk.

References

External links
 
 
 

1997 births
Living people
People from Okhtyrka
Kharkiv State College of Physical Culture 1 alumni
Ukrainian footballers
Association football midfielders
FC Naftovyk-Ukrnafta Okhtyrka players
FC Balkany Zorya players
FC Kolos Kovalivka players
FC Dynamo Kyiv players
Ukrainian Premier League players
Ukrainian First League players
Sportspeople from Sumy Oblast